Miss Ecuador 2011, the 61st Miss Ecuador pageant, was held on March 17, 2011. Claudia Schiess, from Galápagos was crowned Miss Ecuador 2011 by the outgoing titleholder Lady Mina from Guayas. The winner of Miss Ecuador represented her country at Miss Universe 2011.

Results

Placements

Special Awards

Judges 

 Rafael Araneda - Chilean TV presenter
 Marjorie Adum - Jeweler
 Gionni Straccia - Venezuelan fashion designer
 Carlos Ochoa - Ecuadorean TV presenter
 Stefanía Fernández - Miss Universe 2009
 Alonso Espinoza - TAME
 Edwin Rosario - Puerto Rican fashion designer
 María Mosquera de Saman - Make-up artist
 Luis De Los Reyes - Renault

Contestants

Notes

Returns

Last Competed in:

2005:
 Carchi
 Galápagos
2009:
 El Oro
 Esmeraldas 
 Los Ríos 
 Santo Domingo

Withdraws

 Bolívar
 Cañar 
 Chimborazo 
 Tungurahua

Reality
January 17, 2011 was the first elimination where Nelly Carreño from Guayas was eliminated because the judges said that she was really skinny. The judges were: Dr. Nelson Estrella, Dr. Mariana Mosquera, and Mr. Marco Tapia.
January 24, 2011 was the second elimination but no one was eliminated because four contestants have had an accident.
January 31, 2011 was the third elimination where Emily Briones from Pichincha was eliminated due she hasn't finished high school. The judges were: Andriana Loor, María Fernanda Coello, and Heytel Moreno.
February 7, 2011 was the fourth elimination where Jéssica Cortez from Esmeraldas was eliminated due not complete to the official events. The judges were: Laura Perrone, Martha Tetamanti, and Alberto Cajamarca.

Crossovers

Claribel González competed in Reina de Manta 2002 where she was 2nd Runner-up, and she won Models New Generation in 2007
María Fernanda Cornejo is an Ecuadorian Top Model who competed in Models New Generation in 2004, and Elite Models in Curaçao and won the Miss Tersovit 2010 crown Miss International 2011.
Jéssica Mercado was Reina del Esmeraldeñismo in 2005.
Andrea Hurtado competed in Reina de Quito 2005, but she was unplaced.
Rina María Cantó was Reina de Urdaneta 2007 and Reina de Los Ríos 2007.
Olga Álava was Virreina de Guayaquil 2008.and competed in Miss Earth 2011 and she won.
Leslie Ayala competed in Reina de Guayaquil 2008 but she was unplaced, and she was 1st Runner-up in Miss Piel Dorada 2009.
María Dolores Saavedra is Reina de Santo Domingo 2010.
Mireya Levy is Reina de Tulcan 2010, Reina de Carchi 2010, and Reina de Mi Tierra 2010.
Claudia Schiess competed in Miss Supranational 2010, but unplaced. She was born in Galápagos Islands, but her father is Ecuadorian and her mother is of Swiss and German ancestry.
Natasha Rivera is Reina de Veinticuatro de Mayo 2010 and Virreina de Manabi 2010.
Jhoanna Ruiz is Reina de Zapotillo 2010.
Verónica Vargas won Nereida de la Armada Nacional 2009.
María José Maza won CN Modelos Search 2010.
Ana Carolina Ortega competed in Reina de Guayaquil 2010, but she was unplaced.

References

External links
Official Miss Ecuador website

2011 beauty pageants
Beauty pageants in Ecuador
Miss Ecuador